Point of View, Inc. was a privately held developer of video games headquartered in Irvine, California. The company was dissolved in 2010.

The company's titles include the remake of N.A.R.C., Nascar 06, and the remake of Spy Hunter. They have also made a game based on the hit television series The Shield.

Many of the company's employees previously worked at studios such as Interplay and Troika Games.

The studio employed 30 developers in 2009, and worked on Damnation and TNA Wrestling for the Xbox 360, and PlayStation 3.

In 2010, after a tumultuous relationship with partner Blue Omega Entertainment, and UK based publisher Codemasters, the company went out of business citing "financial difficulties" and lack of work.

History
Point of View, Inc. was founded in February 1996 by three game industry veterans. The leaders of the company are founders Chris Warner (President) Mark Nausha (Vice President Business Development) and Mike Terlecki (Vice President of Technology).

Games
Point of View has developed titles stretching from the Dreamcast Game console to the next-gen platforms. In 11 years the company has released 32 game titles (over 90 SKUs) with many of the game industries most successful publishing houses, including Electronic Arts, Namco, Midway Games, Crave Entertainment, and MGA Entertainment. Below is a list of games the company has developed.

Black Dawn (Sega Saturn version)
Brunswick Pro Bowling (Wii, PS2, PSP)
Brunswick Circuit Pro Bowling
Damnation
Deuce (cancelled)
Freaky Flyers (Nintendo Gamecube version)
Garfield: Caught in the Act (PC version)
Golden Nugget (PlayStation version)
MLB Slugfest 20-04 (GameCube and Xbox versions)
Mortal Kombat Trilogy (Sega Saturn and PC versions)
Narc (PC version)
NFL Blitz
NFL Blitz 20-02 (GameCube and Xbox versions)
NFL Blitz 20-03
NFL Blitz 2000 (PC version)
Rampage World Tour (Sega Saturn and PC versions)
Ready 2 Rumble Boxing
Ready 2 Rumble Boxing: Round 2
RedCard 20-03
Smashing Drive (GameCube and Xbox versions)
Sonic X-treme (cancelled)
Spawn: Armageddon
Sports Car GT (PlayStation version)
SpyHunter (Nintendo Gamecube port)
The Scorpion King: Rise of the Akkadian
TNA Impact!: Cross the Line
World Championship Poker 2 Featuring Howard Lederer
The Shield

References

External links
 Official website

Defunct video game companies of the United States
Video game development companies
Video game companies established in 1996
Video game companies disestablished in 2010
Defunct companies based in Greater Los Angeles
1996 establishments in California
2010 disestablishments in California